Derby Etches Park is a railway traction and rolling stock maintenance depot (T&RSMD) operated by  East Midlands Railway, and situated in Derby, England. The depot is located to the east of Derby railway station. InterCity and Diesel Multiple Unit (DMU) trains are serviced and maintained here. The depot code is DY.

History 
In 2022, work began to upgrade the depot to accommodate the incoming Class 810 trains.

Allocation
Stock that is allocated and maintained at Derby Etches Park are the East Midlands Railway Class 222, Class 180, and Class 156 fleets.
East Midlands Railway also stable Class 170s and Class 158s at Derby Etches Park, although these are maintained and allocated at Nottingham Eastcroft depot. There is  a British Rail Class 08 Diesel Locomotive Shunter in operation.

In 1987, the depot's allocation of rolling stock also included Class 08 shunters. Classes 150, 151 and 154 DMUs, and coaching stock were also allocated at that time. Maintenance was also undertaken for the HQ-allocated stock of the Railway Technical Centre.

References

Sources

Rail transport in Derby
Railway depots in England